Cecrita guttivitta, the saddled prominent moth, is a species of moth of the  family Notodontidae. It is found in North America, including Alabama, Arkansas, Connecticut, Delaware, Florida, Georgia, Illinois, Indiana, Iowa, Kansas, Kentucky, Maine, Maryland, Massachusetts, Minnesota, New Brunswick, New Hampshire, New Jersey, New York, North Carolina, Ohio, Oklahoma, Ontario, Pennsylvania, South Carolina, Tennessee, Vermont, Virginia, West Virginia and Wisconsin.

The wingspan is about 40 mm. Adults are brownish to greenish grey with white or black spots on the forewings.  There is one generation per year.

The larvae feed on the foliage of a wide range of woody plants, including apple, birch, blueberry, dogwood, hazel, maple, oak, sumac and walnut.

Gallery

References

Moths described in 1855
Notodontidae
Moths of North America